Amin Razi also known as Omid) was a Safavid-era (16th to 17th century) Persian geographer,  author of a geographical and biographical encyclopedia (tadhkirah)  called Haft iqlīm ( "seven climes") based on the system of seven climes of Ptolemy's Almagest.

Al-Razi was born in Ray, Persia into a prestigious family; his father was Kvajeh Mirza Ahmad, the mayor of Ray by appointment of Tahmasp I (r. 1524–1576). His paternal uncle was Khvajeh Mohammad-Sharif, a poet and minister to the governor of Khorasan and later to the Shah.

Al-Razi states that he completed his encyclopedia in AH 1002 (1593/4) after six years of work, although the work as extant includes additions of younger date. His dates of birth and death are unknown. He may have visited Mughal India during the reign of Akbar.

Haft iqlīm (also Haft eqlīm) provides extensive historical, biographical and topographical information, arranged by "clime", i.e. the major division of the known world by geographic latitude according to Ptolemy.
The total number of biographies in the work is 1,560, in many cases giving more detail than those found in medieval works such as Lubab ul-Albab or Tazkirat al-Awliya.
The work also cited samples of poetry which is not recorded elsewhere, and some prose passages, e.g. by Ubayd Zakani.

Al-Razi's sources have been researched by Naqawī,
who identified thirty-nine. Ethé provides a table of the contents of the work. 
The work survives in numerous manuscripts. The only complete edition is by Jawād Fāżel (1961). The Calcutta edition by Ross et al. is superior to Fāżel's but is incomplete, omitting the fourth clime (which encompasses more than half of the work).

References

 E. D. Ross et al. (eds.), Haft eqlīm, Calcutta, 1918–72. 
Jan Rypka, Hist. Iran. Lit., pp. 452, 495. 
Storey, I., pp. 1169-71.

16th-century births
17th-century deaths
16th-century geographers
People from Ray, Iran
16th-century Iranian writers
16th-century writers of Safavid Iran
17th-century writers of Safavid Iran
17th-century Iranian writers